Anushka Jasraj is a fiction writer from Mumbai, India. She has twice been selected as Asia Regional Winner for the Commonwealth Short Story Prize in 2012 and 2017.

Life
She holds a BFA in film production from New York University and a MFA in creative writing from the New Writers Project as well as a MA in women's and gender studies from the University of Texas-Austin. She was a 2015–16 fellow at the Fine Arts Work Center in Provincetown, Massachusetts, and was awarded the 2017 Stars at Night emerging writer award by American Short Fiction.

Her work has been published in Scroll.in, Internazionale, Adda Stories, and Granta.

References

External links
 

Living people
Indian short story writers
Indian women writers
New York University alumni
University of Texas at Austin College of Liberal Arts alumni
Year of birth missing (living people)